Ayla Aksu and Harriet Dart were the defending champions, but both players chose not to participate.

Marie Bouzková and Rosalie van der Hoek won the title, defeating Ilona Kremen and Iryna Shymanovich in the final, 7–5, 6–7(2–7), [10–5].

Seeds

Draw

Draw

References
Main Draw

Lale Cup - Doubles